Al Shaheed Park is the largest urban park in Kuwait. Al Shaheed Park is considered the most significant green infrastructure project in Kuwait and has one of the largest overstructure greenroofs in the world. Al Shaheed Park is the largest green roof project ever undertaken in the Arab world.

The park is part of the new Kuwait National Cultural District (KNCD). The park consists of several phases. Phase II was inaugurated in April 2017 and Phase III (the largest) is currently under construction.

Overview
Al Shaheed Park is a fully integrated cultural platform with cutting-edge architecture and art works. The park's Amphitheater diversifies into different kinds of gardens (Oasis Garden, Museum Garden, Seasonal Garden and others), walkways (Visitors and Pedestrian Passages), museums, exhibition areas, outdoor theatres, and performance centers for music concerts, theatrical performances, art exhibitions, and other kinds of cultural events. Al Shaheed Park consists of several phases. Phase II of the park opened in April 2017. The new phase includes a skate park, parkour area, tree top climbing obstacles, multipurpose youth complex, board and interactive games area, and an open-air performance centre.

Al Shaheed Park landscapes also hold multiple historical zones such as the Memorial zone and the Museum zone. The park has many activities, including: walking around the park and enjoying the various facilities, the green nature of trees and plants, visiting the many fountains of the park, the water pools distributed throughout it, and the picturesque lakes. Visit the various artistic sculptures, which come in many sizes and from several materials, all of which were made by local artists ,The park is part of the new Kuwait National Cultural District (KNCD).

Museums
Al Shaheed Park contains two museums: Remembrance Museum and Habitat Museum.

The Remembrance Museum shows the critical moments that shaped the Kuwait nation. In the center of the museum, there are four icons which symbolize the four most important battles in the history of Kuwait. Visitors are able to contribute their own experience by recording their testimony in the interactive kiosks, called “Story booths”, for generations to come. 

The Habitat Museum displays the richness and diversity of the natural habitats of Kuwait through a large number of interactive programs and scenographic recreations. At the entrance, visitors receive a “Seed Ticket” containing a chip which allows them to obtain information about that particular seed and interact with each of the multimedia resources in the museum. Recreations of the plants and animals of Kuwait coexist with large format audiovisual productions. The Forces Theater, a 26-meter long audiovisual projection, displays the beauty of the different habitats of Kuwait by means of spectacular panoramic views. The museums offers an audio guide system for the full visitor experience with presence detection, automatic connection and synchronization with the museum's multimedia equipment.

See also
 Kuwait National Cultural District 
 Sheikh Jaber Al Ahmad Cultural Centre
 Sheikh Abdullah Al-Salem Cultural Centre
 Kuwait Vision 2035

References

External links
 

2015 establishments in Kuwait
Museums established in 2016
Entertainment venues in Kuwait
Urban public parks
Parks in Kuwait
Cultural centers in Kuwait
Buildings and structures in Kuwait City
Museums in Kuwait